Dušan Plavšić (born 23 May 1992) is a Serbian football midfielder who plays for Železničar Pančevo.

Club career

BSK Borča
Plavšić started his career with BSK Borča in the Serbian SuperLiga. He only made two appearances during his time with the club, against Spartak Subotica on 5 March 2011 and Red Star Belgrade on 20 March 2011.

Honours
Proleter Novi Sad
Serbian First League: 2017–18

References

External links

 Dušan Plavšić stats at Utakmica.rs
 Dušan Plavšić stats at Prva liga Srbije
 

1992 births
Living people
Footballers from Belgrade
Association football defenders
Serbian footballers
FK Rad players
FK Palić players
FK BASK players
FK BSK Borča players
OFK Mladenovac players
FK Sloboda Užice players
FK Jedinstvo Užice players
FK Železničar Pančevo players
Serbian First League players
Serbian SuperLiga players
Serbian expatriate footballers
Serbian expatriate sportspeople in Slovakia
FK Dukla Banská Bystrica players
Expatriate footballers in Slovakia